This list of horn players and pedagogues  includes notable players of French horn, German horn, natural horn, Vienna horn, tenor (alto) horn, and alphorn.

B

Radek Baborák, former Principal horn Berlin Philharmonic Orchestra, Munich Phil. Orch, Czech Phil. Orch. winner of the ARD, Geneva, Markneukirchen, Concertino Praga Hochschule für Musik Saar.
Andrew Bain, principal horn of the Los Angeles Philharmonic, LA studio player, horn professor at the Colburn School in Los Angeles, California
Georges Barboteu (1924–2006), Former professor at CNSM, member of the French French-horn school, horn instructor of many current French French hornists
Hermann Baumann (*1934), former principal horn Philharmonisches Orchester Dortmund and Stuttgart Radio Symphony Orchestra, winner of the ARD International Music Competition in 1964, soloist, performing on natural horn and valved horn
Richard Bissill, player, composer, arranger and professor
Nigel Black, former principal horn of Philharmonia, London studio player, former head of brass at the Royal College of Music, London
Aubrey Brain, player (1893–1955)
Dennis Brain, player (1921–1957)
Arthur C. Brooks, social scientist whose previous profession was horn player
Timothy Brown, principal horn in BBC Symphony Orchestra and Academy of St Martin in the Fields, Melos Ensemble

C
John Cerminaro, principal New York Philharmonic (1969–79), principal Seattle Symphony 1996–2011
Alan Civil, second horn Royal Philharmonic Orchestra (to Dennis Brain), later principal. In 1955, joined the Philharmonia, and in 1957 became principal horn, after the death of Dennis Brain, principal of BBC Symphony Orchestra from 1966 to 1988
Dale Clevenger, principal horn of the Chicago Symphony Orchestra from 1966 to 2013
Thomas Coates, hornist with Pomp's Cornet Band, Easton, Pennsylvania (1840s to 1850s) and conductor, regimental band, 47th Pennsylvania Infantry Regiment (1861-82)
Geoff Collinson, principal horn, Australian Opera and Ballet Orchestra
David Cripps, Star Wars original trilogy (1977, 1980, 1983) and Superman (1978 film) principal horn, principal horn London Symphony Orchestra for 10 years.

D
Stefan Dohr, principal horn, Berlin Philharmonic, hailed as the "king of his instrument". Visiting Professor at the Royal College of Music, the Sibelius Academy, and a permanent faculty member at the Herbert von Karajan Academy and the Hochschule für Musik 'Hanns Eisler' in Berlin.
Peter Damm, principal horn Dresden Staatskapelle 1969–2002. He is professor of horn at the Carl Maria von Weber music conservatoire.
Vincent DeRosa, LA studio player
Richard Dunbar, was a player of the French horn, playing in the free jazz scene. He was born in Brooklyn, New York, on May 29, 1944, and he died suddenly at the age of 61, apparently of a heart attack, on the way to a gig on February 8, 2006.
Simon de Souza, professor of horn at the Birmingham Conservatoire
Vladimir Djambazov, second horn of the Sofia Philharmonic and composer

E

Pip Eastop, professor of horn at Royal Academy of Music in London
John Entwistle, bass player from The Who, also played horn

F
Philip Farkas, principal Chicago Symphony Orchestra 1936–41 and 1947–60, Cleveland Orchestra 1941–45 and 1946–47, Boston Symphony 1945–46, also horn professor at Indiana University from 1960–1992

G
Jacques-François Gallay (1795–1864), French player, academic at the Paris Conservatoire and composer; author of Méthode pour le Cor (1845)
Livia Ruth Gollancz (1920–2018), principal horn of the Hallé, BBC Scottish Orchestra and other UK ensembles during the 1940s-50s
David Guerrier, French trumpeter and hornist, former professor at CNSM of Lyon

H
Anthony Halstead (horn, natural horn, piano, organ and conductor), exponent of period-instrument performance notably with the Hanover Band 
Anton Joseph Hampel, horn player of the 18th century who developed the technique of hand-stopping
Max Hess, Boston Symphony Orchestra 1905–25, Cincinnati Symphony Orchestra 1925–37
Douglas Hill
Heinrich Hübler

J

Ifor James
Stefan de Leval Jezierski, Berlin Philharmonic
Lin Jiang, Barry Tuckwell Brass Prize winner, principal horn of the Hong Kong Philharmonic Orchestra and Australian World Orchestra.
Timothy Jones, Principal Horn, London Symphony Orchestra

K

Daniel Katzen, former member of Boston Symphony Orchestra, Associate Professor of Horn at the "University of Arizona School of Music" in Tucson
Georg Kopprasch, composer of the Kopprasch Etudes
Helen Kotas Hirsch, principal horn, Chicago Symphony Orchestra (1941-1948), first female brass musician hired by Chicago Symphony Orchestra 
Peter Kurau, principal Rochester Philharmonic and Professor of Horn at the Eastman School of Music

L

Ludwig Wenzel Lachnith, Bohemian horn player and composer of Horn concertos.
Julie Landsman, former Principal Horn, Metropolitan Opera Orchestra (1985–2010), Juilliard faculty since 1989.
Wilhelm Lanzky-Otto
Joseph Leutgeb
Boštjan Lipovšek
Frank Lloyd

M
Joseph Masella, principal horn of both the Montreal Symphony Orchestra and the CBC Montreal Orchestra from 1943 to 1969.
Susan McCullough, professor at Lamont School of Music.
Brown Meggs, writer, Capitol Records executive. Wrote a solo horn variation on the Beatles melody "I Want to Hold Your Hand".
Christian Mengis, hornist and composer at the court of Frederick the Great from 1745.
Ethel Merker, prominent horn player in Chicago beginning in the 1940s, design collaborator on the Holton Merker-Matic line of horns
Philip Myers, principal, New York Philharmonic Orchestra 1980–2017)
Ricardo Matosinhos

N
Marie-Luise Neunecker, former professor at Hochschule für Musik Hanns Eisler Berlin and Hochschule für Musik und Darstellende Kunst Frankfurt am Main, former principal horn at the Bamberg Symphony Orchestra and the Frankfurt Radio Symphony Orchestra.

Jeff Nelsen, horn player for Canadian Brass, on faculty at Indiana University
Hermann Neuling

O

Martin Owen, principal BBC Symphony Orchestra, Professor of Horn at the Royal Academy of Music and Trinity College of Music

P
Vicente Zarzo Pitarch, for 25 years the horn soloist in the Residentie Orkest in the Hague
 Abel Pereira
Valery Polekh
Giovanni Punto
William Purvis

R

Eugene Rittich

S

Neill Sanders, Melos Ensemble, London Orchestras
Will Sanders, Bavarian Radio Symphony Orchestra
Lorenzo Sansone, member of major North American symphony orchestras, music editor, educator, and horn manufacturer.
Gunther Schuller, Cincinnati Symphony Orchestra, Metropolitan Opera Orchestra, and composer
František Šolc, Czech hornist and horn teacher
James Sommerville, Boston Symphony Orchestra
Stephen Stirling, principal horn City of London Sinfonia, co-principal horn Academy of St Martin in the Fields, teaches at Trinity College of Music, soloist, chamber musician
Franz Strauss

T
Esa Tapani, former principal horn Finnish Radio Symphony Orchestra
James Thatcher, LA studio player
Michael Thompson, former principal with Philharmonia Orchestra, teacher at Royal Academy of Music, soloist/chamber musician/clinician
Barry Tuckwell, former principal horn London Symphony Orchestra, soloist and clinician
Bedřich Tylšar, former horn player with the Czech Philharmonic Orchestra, soloist and pedagogue
Zdeněk Tylšar, former principal horn with the Czech Philharmonic Orchestra, soloist and pedagogue

V
William VerMeulen, principal horn of the Houston Symphony Orchestra, Professor of Horn at Rice University since 1990
Eugène Léon Vivier, French player (1821–1900)
Radovan Vlatkovic, former principal of Berlin Radio Symphony Orchestra from 1982 to 1990, teacher at Mozarteum in Salzburg, soloist
Ondřej Vrabec, current solo horn of Czech Philharmonic Orchestra

W

Richard Watkins, principal horn of Philharmonia Orchestra from 1985 to 1996, teaching at Royal Academy of Music, soloist, chamber musician, clinician
Joan Thelma Watson, principal horn of the Canadian Opera Orchestra and a founding member of the True North Brass quintet.
Froydis Ree Wekre, member of Oslo Philharmonic from 1961 to 1991, co-principal from 1965 on, Professor of Horn at Norwegian Academy of Music, soloist, clinician
Kate Westbrook, tenor horn player
Jonathan Williams, British orchestral and solo horn player
Sarah Willis, fourth horn of the Berlin Philharmonic.
Katy Woolley principal horn of the Royal Concertgebouw Orchestra
Laurens Woudenberg, principal horn of the Royal Concertgebouw Orchestra

Use of the horn in jazz
The horn is used only rarely in jazz, but there have been a few notable players:

Pietro Amato, member of The Luyas, Arcade Fire, Bell Orchestre and Torngat
David Amram
John Clark
Vincent Chancey
Sharon Freeman
John Graas
Stefan de Leval Jezierski
Dave Lee
Bob Northern
Willie Ruff
Gunther Schuller
Arkady Shilkloper
Richard Todd
Tom Varner
Julius Watkins

See also

Lists of musicians

References

External links
 Harlan Feinstein's List of Jazz Horn Players

 
Horn players